Jukebox is an album by Jamaaladeen Tacuma. It was recorded from September 1987 to October 1987 and was released in 1988 by Gramavision. It was produced by Jonathan F.P. Rose and Jamaaladeen Tacuma.

Track listing
"A Time A Place" – 4:20
"Meta-Morphosis" – 6:28
"Rhythm Of Your Mind" – 1:40
"Jam-All" – 3:24
"In The Mood For Mood" – 6:18
"Jukebox" – 5:37
"Naima" – 5:18
"Zam Zam Was Such A Wonderful Feeling" – 4:55
"Solar System Blues" – 5:04

Personnel
Jamaaladeen Tacuma – Synthesizer, Bass, Drums, Bass guitar, Electric guitar, Producer, Engineer, Fretless bass, Mixing
Ronnie Drayton – Guitar, Electric guitar
Frederick Phineas – Harmonica
Alfie Pollit – Synthesizer
Dennis Alston – Percussion, Drums
Byard Lancaster – Flute, Saxophone, Tenor saxophone, Pan flute, Bird Calls
Alan Sukennik – Organ, Synthesizer, Piano, Cello, Keyboards, Korg Synthesizer

Credits
Tim Casey – Mixing, Mixing assistant
Phoebe Ferguson – Photography
Joe Ferla – Engineer, Mixing
Angela Gomez – Assistant Engineer
Fred Guyot – Paintings, Cover Painting
Bob Ludwig – Mastering
Jonathan F.P. Rose – Producer, Mixing

1988 albums
Gramavision Records albums